Robert or Bob Russell may refer to:

Politics
Robert Russell (died 1404), English MP for Worcestershire, 1395
Bob Russell (British politician) (born 1946), former British Liberal Democrat MP for Colchester
Bob Russell (Canadian politician), former leader of the Liberal Party of Alberta and municipal councillor in St. Albert, Alberta
Robert B. Russell (1889–1964), Canadian labour organizer and politician
Robert E. Russell (1941–2019), Virginia state senator
Sir Robert Frankland-Russell, 7th Baronet (1784–1849), English politician and artist

Sport
Bob Russell (ice hockey) (born 1955), retired Canadian professional ice hockey player
Robbie Russell (rugby union) (born 1976), Scottish rugby player
Robbie Russell (soccer) (born 1979), American soccer player
Bobby Russell (Australian footballer) (1893–1943), Australian rules footballer
Bobby Russell (footballer, born 1919) (1919–2004), Scottish football wing half (Chelsea)
Bobby Russell (footballer, born 1957), Scottish football midfielder (Rangers, Motherwell)
Jack Russell (cricketer, born 1963) (Robert Charles Russell), former England cricket wicket keeper and artist
Bob Russell (Australian footballer) (born 1945), Australian rules footballer
Rab Russell (born 1953), Scottish footballer

Music, acting and entertainment
Robert Russell (German actor), actor from the 2000 miniseries Dune
Robert Russell (English actor) (1936–2008), English film and television actor in Witchfinder General
Robert W. Russell (1912–1992), American screenwriter
Bob Russell (television presenter) (1908–1998), host of beauty pageants during the 1940s and 1950s
Bobby Russell (1940–1992), American songwriter, wrote "The Night the Lights Went Out in Georgia"
Bob Russell (songwriter) (1914–1970), American songwriter, wrote "He Ain't Heavy, He's My Brother"
Robert Russell, Jamaican who helped found Reggae Sumfest

Other
Robert Russell (activist) (born 1942), American activist and writer, director of Cartoonists Rights Network International
Robert D. Russell, professor of mathematics at Simon Fraser University
Robert Russell (Irish mathematician) (c. 1858–1938), Irish mathematician and academic at Trinity College Dublin
Robert Hamilton Russell (1860–1933), English-born Australian surgeon
Robert Lee Russell (1900–1955), U.S. federal judge
Robert Russell (architect) (1808–1900), London born architect and surveyor active in Australia
Robert John Russell (born 1946), founder and Director of the Center for Theology and the Natural Sciences
Robert T. Russell, U.S. judge
Robert Vane Russell (1873–1915), British civil servant
Robert Tor Russell (1888–1972), British architect
Bob Russell (The West Wing), fictional character played by Gary Cole on the television serial The West Wing